Jaime Ryan (born 8 May 1994) is an Australian competitive sailor. She competed at the 2016 Summer Olympics in Rio de Janeiro, in the women's 470 class. 

Ryan qualified to represent Australia at the 2020 Summer Olympics. Sailing with Tess Lloyd, she competed in the 49erFX event, finishing 13th in the field of 21. Detailed results.

She is the sister of Australian competitive sailor, William Ryan, who won the gold medal in the 470 class.

References

External links

1994 births
Living people
Australian female sailors (sport)
Olympic sailors of Australia
Sailors at the 2016 Summer Olympics – 470
Sailors at the 2020 Summer Olympics – 49er FX
21st-century Australian women